The Prince-Bishopric of Brandenburg was an ecclesiastical principality of the Holy Roman Empire from the 12th century until it was secularized during the second half of the 16th century. It should not be confused with the larger Diocese of Brandenburg established by King Otto I of Germany in 948, in the territory of the Marca Geronis (Saxon Eastern March) east of the Elbe river. The diocese, over which the prince-bishop exercised only spiritual authority, was a suffragan diocese of the Archdiocese of Magdeburg, its seat was Brandenburg an der Havel.

The Prince-Bishopric of Brandenburg was an imperial estate of the Holy Roman Empire for some time, probably starting about 1161/1165. However, the Brandenburg bishops never managed to gain control over a significant territory, being overshadowed by the Margraviate of Brandenburg, which was originally seated in the same city. Chapter and cathedral, surrounded by further ecclesiastical institutions, were located on the Dominsel (Cathedral Island), which formed a prince-episcopal cathedral immunity district (Domfreiheit), distinct from the city of Brandenburg. Only in 1929 the - meanwhile former - immunity district was incorporated into the city itself.

History
 
The foundation charter of the Brandenburg diocese is dated 1 October 948, though the actual founding date remained disputed among historians. The medieval chronicler Thietmar of Merseburg mentions the year 938; the bishopric may also have been established in the course of the partition of the vast Marca Geronis and the emergence of the Northern March after Margrave Gero's death in 965. With the foundation, King Otto (Holy Roman Emperor from 962) aimed at the Christianization of the Polabian Slavs (Wends) and the incorporation of their territory into the East Frankish realm.

Brandenburg was originally a suffragan of the Archbishopric of Mainz, but in 968 it came under the jurisdiction of the Magdeburg archbishops. The Great Slav Rising of 983 practically annihilated it, when revolting Lutici tribes conquered Brandenburg and the neighbouring Bishopric of Havelberg. Brandenburg bishops continued to be appointed, but they were merely titular, residing in Magdeburg or acting as auxiliary bishops in the western territories of the Empire. Not until the final subjugation of the Wends in the 12th century by Margrave Albert the Bear, the German eastward settlement (Ostsiedlung) in the diocesan region revived the bishopric.

Bishop Wigers of Brandenburg (acting 1138–60), an adherent of Norbert of Xanten, was the first of a series of bishops of the Premonstratensian Order, which chose the occupants of the episcopal see until 1447; in that year a bull of Pope Nicholas V gave the right of nomination to the Brandenburg elector, with whom the bishops stood in a close feudal relation. Bishop Wigers also established a Premonstratensian convent at Leitzkau (today part of Gommern, Saxony-Anhalt). Probably at the request of the Hevellian prince Pribislav-Henry, he established another convent at the Slavic Parduin settlement in present-day Brandenburg an der Havel, which became the nucleus of the revived Brandenburg cathedral chapter. The incorporation into the Premonstratensian Order was confirmed by Pope Clement III in 1188.
 
As rulers of imperial immediacy, regnant in a, however, dispersed territory partitioned into the four bailiwicks of Brandenburg/Havel, Ketzin, Teltow and Ziesar. The prince-bishops from the early 14th century onwards resided in their fortress in Ziesar on the road to Magdeburg. The last actual bishop was Matthias von Jagow (d. 1544), who took the side of the Protestant Reformation, married, and in every way furthered the undertakings of the Hohenzollern elector Joachim II.

There were two more nominal bishops, but on the petition of the latter of these, the electoral prince John George of Brandenburg appointed in 1560, the secularisation of the bishopric was undertaken and finally accomplished in 1571, in spite of legal proceedings to reassert the imperial immediacy of the prince-bishopric within the Empire and so to likewise preserve the diocese, which dragged on into the 17th century.

Bishops of Brandenburg
 949–968: Dietmar
 968–980: Dodilo
 980–1004: Volkmar
 992–1018: Wigo
 1022–1032: Luizo
 1032-1048: Rudolf
 1048–1051: Dankwart
 1068–1080: Dietrich I
 1080–1092: Volkmar II
 1100–1122: Hartbert
 1124–1137: Ludolf
 1137–1138: Landbert

Prince-bishops
 1138–1160: Wiggar
 1160–1173: Wilman
 1173–1179: Sigfried I
 1179–1190: Baldran
 1190–1192: Alexius
 1192–1205: Norbert
 1205–1216: Baldwin
 1216–1220: Siegfried II
 1221–1222: Ludolf von Schanebeck, claimant, but not enthroned
 1221–1222: Wichmann von Arnstein, counter-claimant, also not enthroned
 1222–1241: Gernot
 1241–1251: Rutger von Ammendorf
 1251–1261: Otto von Mehringen
 1261–1278: Heinrich I von Osthenen (or Ostheeren)
 1278–1287: Gebhard
 1287–1290: Heidenreich
 1290–1291: Richard, refused the appointment
 1291–1296: Dietrich, not enthroned
 1296–1302: Vollrad von Krempa
 1303–1316: Friedrich von Plötzkau
 1316–1324: Johann I von Tuchen
 1324–1327: Heinrich II Count of Barby, not enthroned
 1327–1347: Ludwig Schenk von Reindorf (or Neuendorf)
 1347–1365: Dietrich II Kothe
 1366–1393: Dietrich III von der Schulenburg
 1393–1406: Heinrich III von Bodendiek (or Bodendieck)
 1406–1414: Henning von Bredow
 1414: Friedrich von Grafeneck, Prince-Bishop of Augsburg 1413–1414
 1415–1420: Johann von Waldow, Bishop of Lebus 1420–1423
 1420: Friedrich von Grafeneck, again
 1421–1459: Stephan Bodecker
 1459–1472: Dietrich IV von Stechow
 1472–1485: Arnold von Burgsdorff
 1485–1507: Joachim I von Bredow
 1507–1520: Hieronymus Schulz (or Scultetus), Bishop of Havelberg 1521–1522
 1520–1526: Dietrich V von Hardenberg

Lutheran bishops
 1526–1544: Matthias von Jagow
 1544–1546: Sede vacante
 1546–1560: Joachim of Münsterberg-Oels
 1560–1569/71: John George of Brandenburg, regent (Verweser)
 1569/71: Joachim Frederick of Brandenburg
Secularized and merged into Brandenburg.

See also 
 List of Former Roman Catholic dioceses of Germany

References
 

Brandenburg Diocese
Brandenburg Bishopric
Brandenburg
Brandenburg Diocese
Brandenburg
Former states and territories of Brandenburg
Brandenburg an der Havel
10th-century establishments in Germany